Pyrogenic carbon capture and storage (PyCCS) is a proposed carbon sequestration technology that can mitigate climate change while improving soil fertility. It is discussed as a promising technology for greenhouse gas removal.

Principle 
The principle of PyCCS is that the biomass (e.g. trees) removes CO2 from the atmosphere during its growth via photosynthesis. This biomass is then harvested and pyrolyzed (see below), with a portion of the carbon dioxide bound in the biomass being captured in the ground, after being reduced to carbon and viscous compounds (charcoal). The flammable gas mixture, which is the lightest fraction in pyrolysis, is collected and used as fuel; the carbon dioxide produced when combusting it is captured traditionally.

Technology 
Pyrolysis in the context of carbon capture and storage has been described by Werner et al. (2018) as "the thermal treatment of biomass at 350 °C–900 °C in an oxygen-deficient atmosphere. Three main carbonaceous products are generated during this process, which can be stored subsequently in different ways to produce [negative emissions]: a solid biochar as soil amendment, a pyrolytic liquid (bio-oil) pumped into depleted fossil oil repositories, and permanent-pyrogas (dominated by the combustible gases CO, H2 and CH4) that may be transferred as CO2 to geological storages after combustion."

In low-oxygen conditions, the thermal-chemical conversion of organic materials (including biomass) produces both volatiles, termed pyrolytic gases (pyrogases), as well as solid carbonaceous co-products, termed biochar. While the pyrogases mostly condense into liquid bio-oil, which may be used as an energy source, biochar has been proposed as a tool for sequestering carbon in soil.

Once mixed into soil, biochar, which is less susceptible to remineralization into CO2 and CH4 than non-pyrogenic biomass, fragments into micro- and nano-particles which can be transported to deeper soil horizons, groundwater, or other compartments that further protect it from degradation. Multiple studies have demonstrated that pyrogenic carbon is stable over centennial timescales.

References

Carbon dioxide removal